Phoebe Watson may refer to:
 Phoebe Amelia Watson (1858–1947), a Canadian painter who decorated china and also worked in watercolors and oils
 Phoebe Holcroft Watson (1898–1980), a tennis player from the United Kingdom

See also
 Phebe Watson (1876–1964), South Australian educator and teachers' union activist